This is a list of architecture schools in Germany.

Academy of arts (Kunsthochschulen)
 Alanus University of Arts and Social Sciences (Alanus Hochschule für Kunst und Gesellschaft in Alter), Faculty of Architecture, Bonn
 Staatliche Akademie der Bildenden Künste Stuttgart, Faculty of Architecture, Stuttgart 
 Academy of Fine Arts Nuremberg
 Kunstakademie Düsseldorf
 Academy of Fine Arts – Städelschule, Frankfurt am Main (postgraduate MA)

Technical Universities (Technische Universitäten) 
 RWTH Aachen (Rheinisch-Westfaelische Technische Hochschule), Faculty of Architecture, Aachen
 Technical University of Berlin (TUB), Faculty VI Planning – Building – Environment, Berlin
 Braunschweig University of Technology, (Technische Universität Braunschweig)
 Brandenburg University of Technology (Brandenburgische Technische Universität), Cottbus, Faculty of Architecture, Civil Engineering and Urban Planning
 Technische Universität Darmstadt (TUD), Faculty XV, Faculty of Architecture, Darmstadt 
 Dresden University of Technology (Technische Universität Dresden)
 Technical University of Karlsruhe, Faculty of Architecture, Karlsruhe 
 Technical University of Munich (TUM), Department of Architecture, München

Universities (Universitäten)
 Berlin University of the Arts (UdK), College of Architecture, Media and Design, Studiengang Architektur, Berlin,  
 Bauhaus University Weimar (BUW), Faculty of Architecture
 Universität Dortmund
 HafenCity University
 Leibniz University Hannover (LUH), Faculty of Architecture and Landscape Sciences, Hanover 
 University of Kassel, Faculty of Architecture and Urban planning, Kassel 
 Universität Siegen
 University of Stuttgart, Faculty of Architecture and Urban Planning, Stuttgart
 Bergische Universität Wuppertal

Universities of Applied Sciences (Hochschulen) 
 Anhalt University of Applied Sciences, Dessau Institute of Architecture, Bauhaus Dessau, (Masters School / M.Arch / language: English)
 Fachhochschule Aachen
 Augsburg University of Applied Sciences (Fachhochschule Augsburg)
Berlin International University of Applied Sciences
Beuth University of Applied Sciences Berlin
 University of Applied Sciences Biberach
 University of Applied Sciences Bremen, Department of Architecture, Bremen 
 Hochschule 21 in Buxtehude (HS21), Buxtehude 
 Hochschule Bochum
 Fachhochschule Coburg
 Fachhochschule Lausitz in Cottbus
 Fachhochschule Lippe und Höxter in Detmold Detmold 
 Fachhochschule Dortmund
 Fachhochschule Düsseldorf
 Darmstadt University of Applied Sciences (Hochschule Darmstadt) (h_da), Faculty of Architecture, Darmstadt 
 Hochschule Anhalt in Dessau
 Hochschule für Technik und Wirtschaft Dresden
 Fachhochschule Erfurt
 University of Applied Sciences Frankfurt am Main, (Fachhochschule Frankfurt am Main), Frankfurt am Main 
 Staatliche Hochschule für Bildende Künste – Städelschule (postgraduate MA)
 Fachhochschule Gießen-Friedberg
 Fachhochschule Heidelberg
 Fachhochschule Hildesheim/Holzminden/Göttingen in Hildesheim
 Fachhochschule Hildesheim/Holzminden/Göttingen in Holzminden
 Fachhochschule Kaiserslautern
 Fachhochschule Koblenz
 Technical University of Cologne
 Karlsruhe University of Applied Sciences, (Hochschule Karlsruhe)
 Hochschule Konstanz
 Fachhochschule Lübeck
 Hochschule für Technik, Wirtschaft und Kultur Leipzig
 Fachhochschule Mainz
Fachhochschule Münster (Münster School of Architecture)
 Fachhochschule Bielefeld in Minden
 Munich University of Applied Sciences, Faculty of Architecture
 Technische Hochschule Nürnberg
 Akademie der Bildenden Künste Nürnberg
 Fachhochschule Oldenburg/Ostfriesland/Wilhelmshaven in Oldenburg
 Fachhochschule Potsdam
 Hochschule Wismar
 Hochschule Zittau/Görlitz in Zittau

References

 
Germany
Architecture